Gilbert Bluff is a rock bluff with abrupt cliff faces on the north and east sides, located on the south side of Garfield Glacier and near the north margin of Erickson Bluffs in the McDonald Heights area of coastal Marie Byrd Land.  

Mapped by United States Geological Survey (USGS) from surveys and U.S. Navy air photos, 1959–65.  Named by Advisory Committee on Antarctic Names (US-ACAN) for James R. Gilbert, member of the biological party that made population studies of seals, whales and birds in the pack ice of the Bellingshausen and Amundsen Seas using USCGC Southwind and its two helicopters, 1971–72.

References

Cliffs of Marie Byrd Land